Bagamér is a village in Hajdú-Bihar county, in the Nyíradony District of Hungary.

Geography

References

External links

 Official site in Hungarian

Populated places in Hajdú-Bihar County